The Social Democratic Party of Germany (SPD) is a centre-left social democratic political party in Germany. It is one of the major parties of contemporary Germany.

Saskia Esken has been the party's leader since the 2019 leadership election together with Lars Klingbeil, who joined her in December 2021. After Olaf Scholz was elected chancellor in 2021 the SPD became the leading party of the federal government, which the SPD formed with the Greens and the Free Democratic Party, after the 2021 federal election. The SPD is a member of 11 of the 16 German state governments and is a leading partner in seven of them.

The SPD was established in 1863. It was one of the earliest Marxist-influenced parties in the world. From the 1890s through the early 20th century, the SPD was Europe's largest Marxist party, and the most popular political party in Germany. During the First World War, the party split between a pro-war mainstream and the anti-war Independent Social Democratic Party, of which some members went on to form the Communist Party of Germany (KPD). The SPD played a leading role in the German Revolution of 1918–1919 and was responsible for the foundation of the Weimar Republic. SPD politician Friedrich Ebert served as the first president of Germany.

After the rise of the Nazi Party to power, the SPD was the only party present in the Reichstag to vote against the Enabling Act of 1933; the SPD was subsequently banned, and operated in exile as the Sopade. After the Second World War, the SPD was re-established. In East Germany, it was forced to merge with the KPD to form the Socialist Unity Party of Germany. In West Germany, the SPD became one of two major parties alongside the CDU/CSU. In the Godesberg Program of 1959, the SPD dropped its commitment to Marxism, becoming a big tent party of the centre-left. The SPD led the federal government from 1969 to 1982, 1998 to 2005 and again since 2021. It served as a junior partner to a CDU/CSU led government from 1966 to 1969, 2005 to 2009 and from 2013 to 2021.

The SPD holds pro-EU stances and is a member of the Party of European Socialists and sits with the Progressive Alliance of Socialists and Democrats group in the European Parliament. With 16 MEPs, it is the third largest party in the group. The SPD was a founding member of the Socialist International, but the party left in 2013 after criticising its acceptance of parties they consider to be violating human rights. The SPD subsequently founded the Progressive Alliance and was joined by numerous other parties around the world. Previously, the SPD was a founding member of both the Second International and the Labour and Socialist International.

History 

The Social Democratic Party has its origins in the General German Workers' Association, founded in 1863, and the Social Democratic Workers' Party, founded in 1869. From 1878 to 1890, the Anti-Socialist Laws banned any group that aimed at spreading socialist principles, but the party still gained support in elections. In 1890, when the ban was lifted, the party adopted its current name. The SPD was the largest Marxist party in Europe and consistently the most popular party in German federal elections from 1890 onward, although it was surpassed by other parties in terms of seats won in the Reichstag due to the electoral system.

In the years leading up to World War I, the SPD remained radical in principle, but moderate in reality. According to Roger Eatwell and Anthony Wright, the SPD became a party of reform, with social democracy representing "a party that strives after the socialist transformation of society by the means of democratic and economic reforms". They emphasise this development as central to understanding 20th-century social democracy, of which the SPD was a major influence. In the 1912 federal election, the SPD won 34.8 per cent of votes and became the largest party in the Reichstag with 110 seats, although it was still excluded from government. Internal opposition to the policy grew throughout the war. Anti-war members were expelled in 1916 and 1917, leading to the formation of the Independent Social Democratic Party of Germany (USPD).

The SPD played a key role in the German Revolution of 1918–1919. On 9 November 1918, leading SPD member Friedrich Ebert was designated chancellor and fellow Social Democrat Philipp Scheidemann, on his own authority, proclaimed Germany a republic. The government introduced a large number of reforms in the following months, introducing various civil liberties and labor rights. The SPD government, committed to parliamentary liberal democracy, used military force against more radical communist groups, leading to a permanent split between the SPD and the USPD (later the Communist Party of Germany, KPD). The SPD was the largest party during the first 13 years of the new Weimar Republic. It decisively won the 1919 federal election with 37.9 per cent of votes, and Ebert became the first president in February. The position of chancellor was held by Social Democrats until the 1920 federal election, when the SPD lost a substantial portion of its support, falling to 22 per cent of votes. After this, the SPD yielded the chancellery to other parties, although it remained part of the government until 1924. Ebert died in 1925 and was succeeded by conservative Paul von Hindenburg. After making gains in the 1928 federal election, the SPD's Hermann Müller became chancellor.

As Germany was struck hard by the Great Depression, and unable to negotiate an effective response to the crisis, Müller resigned in 1930. The SPD was sidelined as the Nazi Party gained popularity and conservatives dominated the government, assisted by Hindenburg's frequent use of emergency powers. The , the SPD's paramilitary wing, was frequently involved in violent confrontations with the Nazi Sturmabteilung. The Nazis overtook the SPD as the largest party in July 1932 and Adolf Hitler was appointed chancellor in January 1933. Of the parties present in the Reichstag during the passage of the Enabling Act of 1933, the SPD was the only one to vote against; most of the communist deputies had been arrested ahead of the vote. The SPD was banned in June. Many members were subsequently imprisoned and killed by the Nazi government while others fled the country. The party-in-exile was called Sopade.

After the end of World War II, the re-establishment of the SPD was permitted in the Western occupation zones in 1945. In the Soviet occupation zone, the SPD was forcibly merged with the KPD in 1946 to form the Socialist Unity Party of Germany (SED). The SED was the ruling party of East Germany until 1989. In West Germany, the SPD became one of two major parties, alongside the Christian Democratic Union (CDU). In the inaugural 1949 federal election, it placed second with 29.2 per cent of votes and led the opposition to the CDU government. In its 1959 Godesberg Program, the party dropped its commitment to Marxism and sought to appeal to middle class voters, becoming a big tent party of the centre-left.

Although strongly leftist, the SPD was willing to compromise. Only through its support did the governing CDU/CSU pass a denazification law that its coalition partner the Free Democratic Party (FDP) and the far-right German Party voted against. At the same time, the SPD opposed the pro-West integration of West Germany because they believed that made a re-unification of Germany impossible. Austria could have become a sovereign neutral state in 1956, but a 1952 Soviet suggestion for Germans to form a neutral state was ignored by the CDU/CSU–FDP government. After 17 years in opposition, the SPD became the junior partner in a grand coalition with the CDU/CSU which lasted from 1966 to 1969. After the 1969 federal election, the SPD's Willy Brandt became chancellor in a coalition with the liberal Free Democratic Party. His government sought to normalise relations with East Germany and the Eastern Bloc, a policy known as Ostpolitik. The party achieved its best ever result of 45.8 per cent in 1972, one of only three occasions in which it formed the largest Bundestag faction. After Brandt's resignation in 1974, his successor Helmut Schmidt served as chancellor until 1982, when the SPD returned to opposition.

During the Peaceful Revolution in East Germany, the East German SPD was refounded. It merged with the West German party in 1990, shortly before German reunification. The SPD returned to government under Gerhard Schröder after the 1998 federal election in a coalition with The Greens. This government was re-elected in 2002 but defeated in 2005. The SPD then became junior partner of a grand coalition with the CDU/CSU until 2009. After a term in opposition, they again served as junior partner to the CDU/CSU after the 2013 federal election. This arrangement was renewed after the 2017 federal election. SPD narrowly won against the CDU/CSU in the September 2021 federal election, becoming the biggest party in the federal parliament (Bundestag). Social Democrat Olaf Scholz became the new chancellor in December 2021, and formed a coalition government with the Green Party and the Free Democrats.

Party platform 

The SPD was established as a Marxist party in 1875. It underwent a major shift in policies, reflected in the differences between the Heidelberg Program of 1925 which called for "the transformation of the capitalist system of private ownership of the means of production to social ownership" and the Godesberg Program of 1959 which aimed to broaden the party's voter base and to move its political position toward the political centre. After World War II, the SPD was re-formed in West Germany after being banned by the Nazi regime; in East Germany, it merged with the Communist Party of Germany to form the ruling Socialist Unity Party of Germany. Under the chairmanship of Kurt Schumacher, the SPD was a socialist party representing the interests of the working class and of trade unions. With the 1959 Godesberg Program, the party evolved from a socialist working-class party to a modern social-democratic party working within democratic capitalism. The SPD's Hamburg Programme, adopted in 2007, describes democratic socialism as "an order of economy, state and society in which the civil, political, social and economic fundamental rights are guaranteed for all people, all people live a life without exploitation, oppression and violence, that is in social and human security" and as a "vision of a free, just and solidary society", the realization of which is emphasized as a "permanent task". Social democracy serves as the "principle of action".

The party platform of the SPD espouses the goal of social democracy, which it envisions as a societal arrangement in which freedom and social justice are paramount. According to the party platform, political freedom, justice and social solidarity form the basis of social democracy.
 The coordinated social market economy should be strengthened and its output should be distributed fairly. The party sees that economic system as necessary in order to ensure the affluence of the entire population.
 The SPD also supports a welfare state.
 Concurrently, it advocates a sustainable fiscal policy that does not place a burden on future generations while eradicating budget deficits.
 In social policy, the Social Democrats stand for civil and political rights in an open society.
 In foreign policy, the party aims at ensuring global peace by balancing global interests with democratic means; European integration is a main priority.
 The SPD supports economic regulations to limit potential losses for banks and people. They support a common European economic and financial policy to prevent speculative bubbles as well as to foster environmentally sustainable growth.

Internal factions 
The SPD is mostly composed of members belonging to either of the two main wings, namely the Keynesian social democrats and Third Way moderate social democrats belonging to the Seeheimer Kreis. While the more moderate Seeheimer Kreis generally support the Agenda 2010 programs introduced by Chancellor Gerhard Schröder, the classical social democrats continue to defend classical left-wing policies and the welfare state. The Keynesian left-wing of the SPD claims that in recent years the welfare state has been curtailed through reform programs such as the Agenda 2010, Hartz IV, and the more economic liberal stance of the SPD which were endorsed by centrist social democrats. In reaction to Agenda 2010, an inner-party dissident movement developed, leading to the foundation of the new party Labour and Social Justice – The Electoral Alternative (Arbeit & soziale Gerechtigkeit – Die Wahlalternative, WASG) in 2005, which later merged into The Left (Die Linke) in 2007. The Parlamentarische Linke comprises left-wing SPD Members of the German Bundestag.

Base of support

Social structure 
Prior to World War II, as the main non-revolutionary left-wing party the Social Democrats fared best among non-Catholic workers as well as intellectuals favouring social progressive causes and increased economic equality. Led by Kurt Schumacher after World War II, the SPD initially opposed both the social market economy and Konrad Adenauer's drive towards Western integration fiercely, but after Schumacher's death it accepted the social market economy and Germany's position in the Western alliance in order to appeal to a broader range of voters. It still remains associated with the economic causes of unionised employees and working class voters. In the 1990s, the left and moderate wings of the party drifted apart, culminating in a secession of a significant number of party members which later joined the socialist party WASG, which later merged into The Left (Die Linke).

Geographic distribution 

Much of the SPD's current-day support comes from large cities, especially northern and western Germany and Berlin. As of 2019, 10 of the country's 15 biggest cities are led by SPD mayors. The metropolitan Ruhr Area, where coal mining and steel production were once the main industries, have provided a significant base for the SPD in the 20th century. In the city of Bremen, the SPD has continuously governed since 1949.

In southern Germany, the SPD typically garners less support except in the largest cities. At the 2009 federal election, the party lost its only constituency in the entire state of Bavaria (in Munich).

Small town and rural support comes especially from the traditionally Protestant areas of northern Germany and Brandenburg (with notable exceptions such as Western Pomerania where CDU leader Angela Merkel has her constituency) and a number of university towns. A striking example of the general pattern is the traditionally Catholic Emsland, where the Social Democrats generally gain a low percentage of votes, whereas the Reformed Protestant region of East Frisia directly to the north, with its strong traditional streak of anti-Catholicism, is one of their strongest constituencies.

Further south, the SPD also enjoys solid support in northern Hesse, parts of Palatinate and the Saarland. The social democrats are weakest in the south-eastern states of Bavaria, Saxony and Thuringia, where the party's percentage of votes dropped to single-digit figures in the 2018 and 2019 elections.

Post-war leadership 

The federal leader is supported by six Deputy Leaders and the party executive. As of 2021, the leaders are Saskia Esken and Norbert Walter-Borjans. The previous leader was Andrea Nahles, who announced her pending resignation on 2 June 2019. As Germany is a federal republic, each of Germany's states have their own SPD party at the state level.

Party leaders

Leaders in the Bundestag 
From August until October 2010, senior Bundestag member Joachim Poß served as interim Bundestag leader in the absence of Frank-Walter Steinmeier, who was recovering from donating a kidney to his wife.

Federal Presidents

Federal Chancellors

Vice Chancellors

State-level

Election results 

The SPD, at times called SAPD, took part in general elections determining the composition of parliament. For elections up until 1933, the parliament was called the Reichstag, except for the one of 1919 which was called the National Assembly and since 1949 the parliament is called Bundestag. Note that changes in borders (1871, 1919, 1920, 1949, 1957 and 1990) varied the number of eligible voters whereas electoral laws also changed the ballot system (only constituencies until 1912, only party lists until 1949 and a mixed system thereafter), the suffrage (women vote since 1919; minimum active voting age was 25 till 1918, 20 till 1946, 21 till 1972 and 18 since), the number of seats (fixed or flexible) and the length of the legislative period (three or four years). The list begins after the SPD was formed in 1875, when labour parties unified to form the SPD (then SAPD, current name since 1890).

Imperial Germany (Reichstag)

Weimar Republic (Reichstag)

Federal parliament (Bundestag)

European Parliament

State parliaments (Länder)

Results timeline

See also 

 Bundestag (Federal Assembly of Germany)
 Elections in the Free State of Prussia
 Iron Front
 List of political parties in Germany
 Mierscheid Law
 Party finance in Germany
 Politics of Germany
 Weimar Republic

Notes

References

Further reading 
 Orlow, Dietrich. Common Destiny: A Comparative History of the Dutch, French, and German Social Democratic Parties, 1945–1969 (2000) online.
 Carl E. Schorske, German Social Democracy, 1905–1917: The Development of the Great Schism (Harvard University Press, 1955).
 Vernon L. Lidtke, The Outlawed Party: Social Democracy in Germany, 1878–1890 (Princeton University Press, 1966).
 Berlau, Abraham. German Social Democratic Party, 1914–1921 (Columbia University Press, 1949).
 Maxwell, John Allen. "Social Democracy in a Divided Germany: Kurt Schumacher and the German Question, 1945–1952." Ph.D. dissertation, West Virginia University, Department of History, Morgantown, West Virginia, 1969.
 McAdams, A. James. "Germany Divided: From the Wall to Reunification." Princeton University Press, 1992 and 1993.
 Erich Matthias, The Downfall of the Old Social Democratic Party in 1933 pp. 51–105 from Republic to Reich The Making of the Nazi Revolution Ten Essays edited by Hajo Holborn, (New York: Pantheon Books, 1972).
Eric D. Weitz, Creating German Communism, 1890–1990: From Popular Protests to Socialist State. Princeton, NJ: Princeton University Press, 1997.
David Priestand, Red Flag: A History of Communism," New York: Grove Press, 2009.

External links 

  
 History of the German social-democratic party

 
Political parties established in 1875
Political parties of the German Empire
Political parties in the Weimar Republic
Party of European Socialists member parties
Social democratic parties
Social democratic parties in Germany
Second International
Centre-left parties in Europe
Members of the Labour and Socialist International
Progressive Alliance
Parties represented in the European Parliament
1875 establishments in Germany
Social democratic parties in Europe